Out of the Blue is the sixth album by American rock singer Donnie Iris, released in 1992.  The album is partly a 'best-of' collection as it consists of seven previously released tracks and six new songs ("Love Whispers," "On Our Way to Paradise," "Be Still My Heart," "Stray Cat," "The Mad Siberian" and "Temptation").  These six tracks were originally recorded for the band's unreleased 1986 album Cruise Control, and were remixed for this release.

Track listing
"Ah! Leah!" (Avsec, Iris) – 3:44	
"Love Whispers" (Avsec, Iris, Lee) – 3:22	
"That's The Way Love Ought to Be" (Avsec, Iris) – 4:17 	
"Injured in the Game of Love" (Avsec, Iris) – 3:24
"On Our Way to Paradise" (Avsec, Iris, Lee) – 5:05 	
"Be Still My Heart" (Avsec, Iris) – 3:39
"10th Street" (Avsec, Iris) – 3:41
"Stray Cat" (Avsec, Iris, Lee) – 3:49 	
"The Mad Siberian" (Avsec, Iris, Lee) – 3:33 	
"Ridin' Thunder" (Avsec, Iris, Lee) – 3:56
"Temptation" (Avsec, Iris, Lee) – 3:44
"Love Is Like a Rock" (Avsec, Iris, Lee, McClain, Valentine) – 3:34
"I Want You Back" (Avsec, Iris) – 3:27

Personnel
Donnie Iris - lead and background vocals, guitar  	
Mark Avsec - keyboards, harmonica and background vocals 	
Marty Lee Hoenes - guitars and background vocals 	
Albritton McClain - bass guitar and background vocals (tracks 1, 3, 4, 7, 10, 12 and 13)
Kevin Valentine - drums and percussion (tracks 1, 3, 4, 7, 10, 12 and 13)
 Scott Alan Williamson - bass guitar and background vocals (tracks 2, 5, 6, 8, 9 and 11)
 Tommy Rich - drums and percussion (tracks 2, 5, 6, 8, 9 and 11)

Production
Mastering: Rick Essig
Producer: Mark Avsec

References

Donnie Iris albums
1992 albums
Albums produced by Mark Avsec